Jonathan Jacquet (born 30 April 1984) was an Argentine footballer.

He played for Coquimbo Unido.

References
 Profile at BDFA 

1984 births
Living people
Argentine footballers
Argentine expatriate footballers
Coquimbo Unido footballers
Deportes Copiapó footballers
Expatriate footballers in Chile
Association football midfielders
Footballers from Santa Fe, Argentina